Mamidi-kud-uru is a village in Mamidikuduru Mandal, Dr. B.R. Ambedkar Konaseema district, Andhra Pradesh, India.

References 

Villages in Mamidikuduru mandal